is a railway station on the Kominato Line in Ichihara, Chiba, Japan, operated by the private railway operator Kominato Railway

Lines
Umatate Station is served by the Kominato Line, and is 12.4 kilometers from the western terminus of the line at Goi Station.

Station layout
Umatate Station has two opposed side platforms connected by a level crossing. The wooden station building dates from 1925, and is unattended.

Platforms

Adjacent stations

History
Umatate Station was opened on March 7, 1925.

See also
 List of railway stations in Japan

External links

 Kominato Railway station information 

Railway stations in Japan opened in 1925
Railway stations in Chiba Prefecture